Lundy is a surname of Old Scandinavian origins.

People
Benjamin Lundy, a Quaker who worked for the abolition of slavery
Curtis Lundy, a member of jazz vocalist Betty Carter's band
Damian Lundy, religious brother of the De La Salle Order
Dennis Lundy, American football player
Dick Lundy (animator), the animator who created the cartoon character Donald Duck
Dick Lundy (baseball player), a Negro leagues baseball player
George Lundy, an American Jesuit, social justice activist and President of Wheeling Jesuit University
J. Edward Lundy, a CFO of Ford Motor Company
Kate Lundy, a member of the Australian Senate, representing the Australian Capital Territory
Lamar Lundy, an NFL defensive end with the Los Angeles Rams
Mark Lundy, convicted of the murders of Christine and Amber Lundy in New Zealand
Michael Lundy, retired United States Army lieutenant general
Robert Lundy, a governor of Derry 
Ron Lundy, an American radio announcer
Wali Lundy, an American football running back
Yvette Lundy, a member of the French Resistance during World War II

Fictional characters
 Celeste Lundy, a fictional character from the TV series Beverly Hills 90210
 Frank Lundy, a fictional character from the TV series Dexter
 Hertzell Lundy, a fictional character from the TV series Little House on the Prairie
 Peter Lundy, titular character from the telemovie Peter Lundy and the Medicine Hat Stallion

References

See also
 Hok Lundy (1950–2008; surnamed Hok) Cambodian police officer
 Lindy (disambiguation)